The Tucson Rustlers are a defunct professional ice hockey team which played in the Pacific Hockey League during the 1978–79 season. Based in Tucson, Arizona, the team played its home games out of the Tucson Community Center.

Coached by Monte Miron, in its only season of play, the Rustlers placed fourth out of six teams with a record of 20 wins, 38 losses, and 0 ties.

References

Defunct ice hockey teams in the United States
Sports in Tucson, Arizona
Ice hockey teams in Arizona
1978 establishments in Arizona
1979 disestablishments in Arizona
Ice hockey clubs established in 1978
Ice hockey clubs disestablished in 1979